Natalya Konstantinovna Matveyeva (born 23 May 1986) is a Russian cross-country skier who has been competing since 2004. Matveyeva skis for Dynamo Moscow. She has a total of four victories since 2004, including three in the 2006–2007 season. All four of her victories have been in the sprint events.

Career
As of February 2007, Matveyeva leads the women's sprint category in the 2006–2007 Cross country skiing World Cup going into the FIS Nordic World Ski Championships 2007 in Sapporo, Japan, despite never having won a World Cup event. Her best placing in individual World Cup meets is second-place, which she achieved in the 2006 Changchun and Düsseldorf meets. She competed in the 2006 Winter Olympics in Turin, finishing 30th in the individual sprint.

She tested positive for recombinant EPO (EPO) at a January 2009 meet in Whistler, British Columbia and was suspended provisionally from the sport following the receipt of the confirmation of the V analysis from the World Anti-Doping Agency (WADA) accredited laboratory in Quebec. The case was reviewed and adjudicated by the FIS Doping Panel, chaired by Canadian judge Partick Smith. Matveyeva's results from the most recent results from the world championships in Liberec have not been removed from the official results pending the hearing though she finished fourth in the women's individual sprint event. A verdict was rendered on 23 December 2009 by the FIS that effectively banned her from competition until 12 March 2011 for doping.

In December 2017, she was one of eleven Russian athletes who were banned for life from the Olympics by the International Olympic Committee, after doping offences at the 2014 Winter Olympics. In January 2018,  she successfully appealed against the lifetime ban as well as decision to disqualify her from Sochi Olympics at the Court of Arbitration for Sport.

Cross-country skiing results
All results are sourced from the International Ski Federation (FIS).

Olympic Games

World Championships
 1 medal – (1 silver)

World Cup

Season standings

Individual podiums
2 victories  – (2 )
12 podiums – (12 )

Team podiums
 2 victories – (2 )
 7 podiums – (7 )

References

External links
 Eurosport.com profile
 
 
 

1986 births
Living people
Doping cases in cross-country skiing
Russian sportspeople in doping cases
Cross-country skiers at the 2006 Winter Olympics
Cross-country skiers at the 2014 Winter Olympics
Russian female cross-country skiers
Olympic cross-country skiers of Russia
FIS Nordic World Ski Championships medalists in cross-country skiing
Skiers from Moscow